PyQuante is an open-source (BSD) suite of programs for developing quantum chemistry methods using Gaussian type orbital (GTO) basis sets. The program is written in the Python programming language, but has "rate-determining" modules written in C for speed, and also uses and requires the NumPy linear algebra extensions to Python. The resulting code, though not as fast as other quantum chemistry programs, is much easier to understand and modify. The goal of this software is not necessarily to provide a working quantum chemistry program but rather to provide a set of tools so that scientists can construct their own quantum chemistry programs without going through the tedium of having to write every low-level routine. PyQuante 1.6.3 is the latest stable version of the program.

PyQuante features
 Hartree–Fock: restricted closed-shell and unrestricted open-shell implementations;
 Density functional theory: LDA (SVWN, Xalpha) and GGA (BLYP) functionals;
 Optimized-effective potential method for orbital-dependent density functional approximations;
 Two electron integrals computed using Huzinaga, Rys, or Head-Gordon/Pople techniques; C and Python interfaces to these programs;
 MINDO/3 semiempirical energies and forces;
 CI-singles excited states;
 DIIS convergence acceleration;
 Second-order Møller–Plesset perturbation theory (MP2).

See also
 PyQuante SourceForge Site, which contains information and download links.
PyQuante is written and maintained by Rick Muller.
List of quantum chemistry and solid state physics software

Computational chemistry software